Willk'i (Aymara for gap, also spelled Willkhi) is a  mountain in the Andes of Bolivia. It lies in the Oruro Department, Sajama Province, Turco Municipality. Willk'i lies southeast of Acotango.

References 

Mountains of Oruro Department